NADK may refer to:
NAD+ kinase, an enzyme
National Army of Democratic Kampuchea, a Cambodian guerrilla force